Laiki agora (Greek for people's market), also common in the plural Laikes agores (people's markets), are farmers' markets that operate all over Greece, selling foodstuffs and gardening or household equipment, as well as children's toys and various "do it yourself" tools.

It is considered an important social custom and tradition in Greece.

History

People's markets were founded by Greek political leader Eleutherios Venizelos.  Part of the motivation was to help local agricultural producers sell their fresh produce to the local population in nearby towns without the need of middlepersons, thus cutting down prices, and from this perspective the introduction of people's markets in Greece can be considered as an application of the commercial practice of disintermediation (or "cutting out the middleperson").

Sellers
There are two kind of sellers in Greek people's markets: the "producers" and the "professionals".

The "producers" are farmers or beekeepers from nearby towns or villages who maintain their own agricultural farms or beehives and produce their own foodstuffs, such as fruits, vegetables, and honey.

The "professionals" purchase foodstuffs from various sources and sell it in the people's markets, but they are not necessarily the original producers of the foodstuffs they sell.

Sellers who sell foodstuffs and gardening equipment can be either "producers" or "professionals", while those who sell household equipment or various children toys and "do it yourself" tools are usually "professionals".

Permits

All sellers must receive a special permit by the government in order to be able to sell produce in a people's market.  There are also strict professional and social requirements.

There are two kind of permits: the "producer's permit" for the "producers", and the "professional's permit" for the "professionals".  Permits, by law, are not given to "producers" over 65 years old or "professionals" over 55 years old.

"Producers" must prove that they are the owners and farmers of a "family farm" (defined as a farm held by a farmer and the other people working on the farm are their husband or wive, children, or close relatives).

Both "producers" and "professionals" need to have completed their obligatory military service, and before a permit is granted the military's office must equip the prospective seller's with a document proving (known as "type A" in Greece) that they have served the military or legally granted an exemption.

"Professionals" are barred from undertaking any other profession, trade, or commercial activity after they are granted a permit to sell products in a people's market.

Products

The Products sold in people's markets are typically those comprising a Mediterranean diet, known for its healthy qualities, and are key ingredients in the cuisine of Greece. Usually local food sold in people's markets is produced by family farms within the same geographical region as the market, and the "producers" who sell the local foodstuffs in the people's markets are usually the farmers themselves who travel from market to market in nearby towns to sell their produce directly to consumers.

All foods, including fish, usually state their place of origin on a card that is displayed together with the product.

The "professionals" sell both local food and food imported from overseas, including avocados, mangos, yellow watermelons, cherry tomatoes, and other exotic fruits often bought from the tropics.

A few people's markets, usually in high-population neighbourhoods, also sell refrigerated seafood, cheese, salamis, and other produce which is preserved in refrigerators set up in the streets and supplied with electricity by diesel generators.  Some  also attract kantines, which also use electricity produced by diesel generators, and prepare and sell souvlakia, sausages-on-a-stick, long-burgers-on-a-stick,  (Greek stuffed hamburgers), soft drinks, et cetera.

Most people's markets also sell traditional home-made/farmer-made olive oil, white wine, red wine, and other products, typically sold in 1.5 litre containers.

In addition to the food market, there is often a market for clothing and kitchenware, with very low prices. In Chania, Crete for instance, this is as large as the agricultural market and as popular. Many of the vendors are Romani. This is an important resource for many Greeks, whose often low salaries make it impossible for them to shop in the stores.

Prevalence

People's markets can be founded in any city neighbourhood, town, suburb, or village with a population of at least 500 people.  The markets are popular all over Greece, including the capital city, Athens, where there are 44  only in downtown, as well as other major cities such as Chania or Patras. They are organised once a week, the same weekday for each particular neighbourhood.

Conveniences

Marketing aspects
Personal marketing is important for the success of a seller in a people's market.  Often, consumers buy from the sellers they know best, thus basing their purchase decisions on a trust basis.  Chatting and frequent social interaction between sellers and consumers is very common, and is cited as one of the reasons many consumers prefer to buy from people's markets instead of supermarkets where the purchasing experience is often less personal.

Consumers are able to choose each individual fruit, fish, or other product from the seller's  (a wooden installation where the products are put), putting their chosen produce in a paper bag or thin bag (plastic) which is then given to the seller for weight measurement.  The local social custom is to choose the fruits or other fresh produce quickly without touching too hard, especially for sensitive vegetables such as tomatoes.

Payment is almost universally done with cash in Euro, but a very small number of "professionals", usually those selling household equipment in high-income neighbourhoods of Athens, accept credit card payments (Visa or MasterCard) with terminals communicating with the bank through GPRS.

Pricing
Pricing is often by the kilogram, but per-item pricing is also common.

Many sellers use the same price by the kilo for all their produce or across many different kinds of products within the same category (e.g. all apples having the same price, no matter whether they are red, green, yellow, or pink apples, although usually these varieties carry different prices in the general market) because in this way the consumer can place various products in the same paper bag and weighting is simplified a lot, thus achieving higher sales.  This is common in apples and pears.

Prices are always listed on a paper card displayed along with the produce.

Dynamic pricing
Sellers change their prices frequently within the same day, especially for sensitive products such as fish.

The price is usually high early in the morning (8-9h00) and is lowered as the time passes, especially if the product does not sell well that particular day.  The new price is advertised on paper cards and orally.  The lowest possible prices can be found after the midday (particularly by 13-14h00), often less than half the original starting price.

After 13h30 or on 14h00 the sellers can make significant discounts where large quantities of fresh fruit or unsold fish can be sold en-masse for extremely low prices.  Sometimes parts of the produce can be given for free if the buyer has cultivated a personal relation with a particular farmer or other seller.

Consumer demographics
The demographics of the consumers visiting the people's markets are varied.

Social aspects
 serve other needs of the lives of the Greeks apart from their consuming needs: they serve the need to communicate with fellow citizens.

People's market are usually organised within a small area, typically a straight street, and the density of people buying foodstuffs can be quite high as the market is organised within a limited and strict timeframe (8h00-14h00).  This, together with the varied demographics of the buyers as typically the whole town's or neighbourhood's inhabitants leave their homes concurrently to visit the same market, cause friends and acquaintances to spot each other while they make their purchases.

As friends find their fellow friends on the market they often stop to exchange news, tell jokes, or to participate in general socialisation.  This social contact is particularly useful in cities, as it helps urban dwellers to stay in contact and maintain long friendships with their neighbours.  In this sense, the  can be thought as being a modern version of the agora of Ancient Greece.

Buyers also engage in social contact with the sellers, which often results in friendship and stable, loyal, multi-year buyer-seller relationships.

Organisational and legal aspects
 are supported by the government's tax income and their management is undertaken by various organisations that have a strict geographical scope.

The Division of people's markets by Attica Region is responsible for the people's markets in the Region of Attica.

See also
Dimotiki agora (demotic market), a different style of traditional market, which is enclosed (a covered market), rather than in the street.
Varvakios Agora, the largest non-covered municipality market in Athens on the Odos Athinas.

References

External links
Weekly programme of people's markets in downtown Athens from the Municipality of Athens
Practical advice
Living in Crete (Pictures of Laiki)

Farmers' markets
Retail markets in Greece
Greek culture